Kenny Oluwafemi Gbolahan Ademola "Femi" Orenuga (born 18 March 1993) is an English footballer who plays as a midfielder.

Career

Southend United
Born in Lewisham, London, Orenuga joined Southend United in 2006 after he impressed the club following his recommendation by an agent.
Not long after joining the club he helped Southend win the Norhalne Cup in Denmark, attracting interest from FC Copenhagen and Brøndby in the process. He became the youngest player to appear for Southend United when he came on as a 93rd-minute substitute in their 3–1 victory over Luton Town in the FA Cup second round on 29 November 2008.

Everton
In March 2009, Orenuga agreed to sign for Premier League team Everton on 1 July for an undisclosed fee believed to be £30,000, increasing based on first team appearances. He joined on a two-year academy scholarship.
He was released from the club on 18 May 2012.

Loan to Notts County
On 21 October 2011, it was confirmed by Notts County that Orenuga had joined on a month-long loan deal.

Sweden 
On 9 November 2012 joined to Sweden and signed a two-year contract with AFC United.

Whitehawk
Following an unsuccessful trial with Crewe Alexandra earlier in the summer, Orenuga played for Northern Premier League First Division South side Carlton Town in pre-season as well as for Dagenham & Redbridge before signing for Whitehawk in August 2014. He left the club having appeared just once in September.

Norway
In September 2014, after a trial with the club, he signed for Norwegian second division side Raufoss. He featured for their first team four times, and three times for the reserves.

Back in England
He joined Gloucester City for the first time in January 2015, and played his part in the run-in towards the end of the 2014–15 season. He started the 2015–16 season at Enfield Town, before re-joining Gloucester City in October 2015. On 5 February 2016 he signed for Wealdstone, and on 19 March 2016 he joined Bedford Town on dual registration terms. On 16 May 2016 he signed a one-year deal with Corby Town.

He moved on to Farnborough, signing for them on 24 November 2016, however the spell was short-lived as he re-joined Bedford Town in December 2016.

Prior to the 2018-season of the Victorian State League Division 2 he joined Peninsula Strikers in Australia until the end of the season. He scored two goals in five league games before leaving the club in June 2018.

Personal life
His younger brother, Keith, is a student in Arsenal FC's Centre of Excellence. He attended Blackheath Bluecoat Church of England School.

References

External links

Femi Orenuga profile  at the Everton F.C. website
Femi Orenuga profile at the Aylesbury United website

1993 births
Living people
Footballers from Lewisham
English footballers
Association football midfielders
Southend United F.C. players
Everton F.C. players
Notts County F.C. players
AFC Eskilstuna players
Whitehawk F.C. players
Raufoss IL players
Gloucester City A.F.C. players
Enfield Town F.C. players
Wealdstone F.C. players
Corby Town F.C. players
English Football League players
Expatriate footballers in Norway
Expatriate footballers in Sweden
English expatriate footballers